The Man Who Came Back is a 2008 American Western film directed by Glen Pitre. It stars Eric Braeden, Billy Zane, George Kennedy, and Armand Assante. Set in southern Louisiana, it is loosely based on the 1887 sugar strike in four parishes and violence that erupted in the Thibodaux Massacre.

Plot
The Man Who Came Back is loosely based on the Thibodaux massacre. This was the culmination of the largest strike in the sugar cane industry, when 10,000 workers stopped labor, and the first to be conducted by a formal labor organization, the Knights of Labor. With an estimated 50 or more African-American cane workers killed by white paramilitary forces, it was the second bloodiest labor strike in U.S. history.

Following Reconstruction and white Democrats regaining control of the state government, in the late 1880s, freedmen worked hard on sugar cane plantations but were bound by many of the planters' practices. They were sometimes paid only in scrip, redeemable only at the plantation's overpriced store, and the workers struggled to get out of debt and be able to leave a plantation.

In an attempt to better their lives, the workers strike. This leads to massive retaliation by the most powerful men in the town, including the sheriff (Armand Assante), the preacher (Al Hayter), power-hungry Billy Duke (James Patrick Stuart), and his vigilante group of thugs.

White overseer Reese Paxton (Eric Braeden) steps up to demand justice for his workers. Duke's rage turns on Paxton and his family. Despite assistance from a Yankee attorney (Billy Zane), Paxton is convicted in a trial presided by Judge Duke (George Kennedy), Billy's father.

After being sent to prison, beaten within inches of his life, and enduring emotional torture, Paxton "comes back" to seek revenge.

Cast
 Eric Braeden as Reese Paxton
 Billy Zane as Ezra
 George Kennedy as Judge Duke
 Armand Assante as Amos
 Sean Young as Kate
 Carol Alt as Angelique Paxton
 James Patrick Stuart as Billy Duke
 Ken Norton as Grandpa
 Peter Jason as The Warden
 Jennifer O'Dell as Prostitute

References

2008 films
2008 action drama films
American Civil War films
Films about American slavery
Films about death
Films about miscarriage of justice
Films about rape
American films about revenge
Films directed by Glen Pitre
American prison drama films
2008 Western (genre) films
American Western (genre) films
2000s English-language films
2000s American films